Władysław Tempka (22 August 1889 in Kraków – 12 June 1940 in Auschwitz) was a Polish politician and lawyer.

Tempka was member of the Sejm from 1928 until 1935. During the Second World War and the German occupation of Poland he was chairman of the resistance organisation "Komitet Wykonawczy SP". He was arrested by the Gestapo and murdered in the Nazi concentration camp Auschwitz.

1889 births
1940 deaths
Lawyers from Kraków
Politicians from Kraków
Polish resistance members of World War II
Polish civilians killed in World War II
Polish people who died in Auschwitz concentration camp
Politicians who died in Nazi concentration camps
20th-century Polish lawyers